The Tax Foundation is an American think tank based in Washington, D.C. It was founded in 1937 by a group of businessmen in order to "monitor the tax and spending policies of government agencies". The Tax Foundation collects data and publishes research studies on U.S. tax policies at both the federal and state levels. Its stated mission is to "improve lives through tax policy research and education that leads to greater economic growth and opportunity".

The Tax Foundation is organized as a 501(c)(3) tax-exempt non-profit educational and research organization, with three primary areas of research: the Center for Federal Tax Policy, the Center for State Tax Policy, and the Center for Legal Reform. The group is known for its annual reports such as Facts & Figures: How Does Your State Compare, which was first produced in 1941, and its "Tax Freedom Day" brochures, which it has produced since the early 1970s.

History
The Tax Foundation was organized on December 5, 1937, in New York City by Alfred P. Sloan Jr., Chairman of the General Motors Corporation; Donaldson Brown, GM Financial Vice President; William S. Farish, President of Standard Oil Company of New Jersey (Exxon); and Lewis H. Brown, President of Johns-Manville Corporation, who later became the first chairman of the board of The Tax Foundation. The organization's stated goal was "to monitor the tax and spending policies of government agencies". Its offices were located at 50 Rockefeller Plaza and later 30 Rockefeller Plaza.

The Tax Foundation's first project was a successful effort to stop a tax increase in Westchester County, New York, where they provided research and analysis (including an "Expenditure Survey" of state spending) to local activists. By 1943, the Tax Foundation had helped set up taxpayers associations and expenditure councils in 35 states.

During World War II, Tax Foundation research emphasized restraining government spending domestically to finance wartime expenditures. In 1948, the Tax Foundation opened an office in Washington, D.C., and in 1978 relocated there completely. Its research and analysis has historically emphasized publicizing federal and state financial information, arguing against the use of tax systems for "social engineering," and urging "broad bases and low rates" tax reform.

Beginning in 1990, the Tax Foundation "operate[d] as a separate unit" of Citizens for a Sound Economy. By July 1991, it was again operating as an independent 501(c)(3) organization.

Beginning in 2009, the Tax Foundation's offices were located in the National Press Building in Washington, D.C. In 2015, the organization moved to its current location on G Street.

Goals and principles
The Tax Foundation states that its research is guided by what it calls the principles of sound tax policy: simplicity, transparency, neutrality, and stability.

Tax Foundation research is generally critical of tax increases, high business taxes, excise taxes, tax preferences for the housing industry, and use of tax credits, which the Foundation views as "picking winners and losers". The Foundation has spoken favorably of efforts to balance the federal budget with tax reform and significant spending cuts, such as the Bowles-Simpson plan, the Ryan Plan, and the Wyden-Coats plan.

Organizational overview

Ideology
The Tax Foundation describes itself as an "independent tax policy research organization". It is cited in the media as a nonpartisan or bipartisan organization, and is also described as business-friendly, conservative, and center-right.

Board of directors
As of 2019, the organization's board of directors consists of David P. Lewis (chairman), James W. Lintott (treasurer), Philip English, Dennis Groth, Douglas Holtz-Eakin, Stephen Kranz, Sarah McGill, David Nicholson, Pamela F. Olson, Tom Roesser, and Scott Hodge (Tax Foundation president).

Finances
The Tax Foundation accepts grants from foundations, corporations, and individuals. It does not solicit or accept funds from government sources. The Tax Foundation has earned a 3 out of 4 star financial rating and 4 out of 4 star accountability and transparency rating from Charity Navigator.

Activities

The Tax Foundation publishes several major studies, including Options for Reforming America's Tax Code, which details the economic and revenue impact of over 80 potential changes to the U.S. tax code.

The group uses its Taxes and Growth (TAG) macroeconomic model to simulate the effects of tax policies and produce conventional and dynamic estimates of potential changes in revenue, GDP, wages, employment, and the distribution of the federal tax burden. The TAG model is a "neoclassical, comparative-statics economic model coupled with a tax return simulator". The economic model estimates supply of labor and cost of capital based on marginal tax rates calculated by the tax return simulator.

Since 2014, the TAG model has been used to analyze legislative and campaign tax proposals, including the Tax Reform Act of 2014 proposed by Dave Camp, plans put forth during the 2016 presidential campaigns, the House GOP's 2016 tax reform blueprint, and the Tax Cuts and Jobs Act.

Since 2013, the Tax Foundation has offered guidance to same-sex married couples filing income taxes at the state level, where local laws recognizing same-sex marriage can vary considerably.

Every year, the Tax Foundation calculates and announces Tax Freedom Days in the United States. These studies have been criticized by the Center on Budget and Policy Priorities (CBPP), a progressive think tank, and in turn the Tax Foundation has responded to or criticized CBPP reports. However, the two groups have worked together on analysis of the marriage penalty in the US federal income tax.

Reception
In a column for The New York Times blog The Upshot, Josh Barro, a former Tax Foundation employee, criticized the group's approach to scoring the Rubio-Lee tax plan as producing "implausibly rosy results". The Tax Foundation published a response to these criticisms, stating that their model results were "in line with analysis done by other mainstream economists for similar tax changes".

In opinion editorials for the New York Times, economist Paul Krugman has characterized the Tax Foundation as "not a reliable source" while criticizing a report by the Tax Foundation comparing corporate tax rates in the United States to those in other countries. Krugman has also accused the Tax Foundation of "deliberate fraud" in connection with a report it issued concerning the American Jobs Act. The Tax Foundation has published various responses to Krugman's criticisms.

See also
 Americans For Fair Taxation
 Americans for Tax Reform
 Citizens for Tax Justice
 Council on State Taxation
 Institute on Taxation and Economic Policy
 National Taxpayers Union
 Tax Policy Center
 Tax Justice Network

References

External links
 
 Organizational Profile – National Center for Charitable Statistics (Urban Institute)

Nonpartisan organizations in the United States
Political and economic think tanks in the United States
Think tanks based in Washington, D.C.
Tax reform in the United States
Non-profit organizations based in Washington, D.C.
Organizations established in 1937
1937 establishments in the United States
501(c)(3) organizations